Amanullah Aman is a Bangladesh Nationalist Party politician and the former Member of Parliament. He is the joint secretary general of BNP.

Early life 
Aman was born in Keraniganj Upazila, Dhaka District.

Career
Aman started his political career in the Jatiyatabadi Chhatra Dal. He was elected as Vice President of Dhaka University Central Students' Union in 1990. He was one of the most prominent student leaders of anti autocracy movement in 1990 which resulted in resignation of General Ershad and a subsequent free fair election under caretaker government.

Aman was first elected as the Member of Parliament for Dhaka-3 at the 1991 general election. He received 97,299 votes while his nearest rival, Mostafa Mohsin Montu of Awami League, received 66,220.

Aman was elected to parliament from Dhaka-3 in the February 1996 Bangladeshi general election which was boycotted by all major parties. He was made the state minister of education. His entourage assaulted a life operator at the secretariat building. Aman was closely tied with Tanaka Group owned by his friend Mahin Chowdhury. He built his home and an office complex in Gulshan.

Aman was re-elected in the June 1996 Bangladeshi general election from Dhaka-3 as a candidate of Bangladesh Nationalist Party. He received 124,096 votes while his nearest rival, Md. Shah Jahan of Awami League, received 52,662 votes.

Aman was re-elected 2001 general elections from Dhaka-3. He received 169,980 votes while his nearest rival, Nasrul Hamid of Awami League, received 89,375 votes.

Aman served as the State Minister of Health and Family Welfare. He was later the State Minister of Labour and Manpower. In 2004, he met the Director General of International Labour Organisation Juan Somavia in Geneva.

Aman was charged in 57 cases over public safety. On 9 May 2008, he was sentenced to seven years in jail in an extortion case filed on 6 March 2007. His wife was also an accused in the case. A former officer in charge of Keraniganj Model Police Station was sued for exempting Aman's name from the murder case of a  Jubo League politician.

Aman was the former General Secretary of Dhaka District unit of Bangladesh Nationalist Party. In October 2009, a businessman in Dhaka asked the government to protect him from Aman who had threatened the businessman for not supporting Bangladesh Nationalist Party.

Aman was charged with burning cars on 9 December 2012 in Tetuljhora and Aminbazar. He was indicted in November 2014.

Aman was sentenced to jail in 2014 over four cases filed against him for violence during general strikes enforced by Bangladesh Nationalist Party. He was relieved of charges on 16 November 2016.

On 3 February 2018, Aman was sent to jail in a case about snatching an accused from police custody. His candidacy for the 2018 Bangladeshi general election was rejected by the Election Commission. His son, Irfan Ibne Aman, was instead nominated by the Bangladesh Nationalist Party from Dhaka-2.

References

1962 births
Living people
People from Dhaka District
University of Dhaka alumni
Bangladesh Nationalist Party politicians
State Ministers of Health and Family Welfare (Bangladesh)
State Ministers of Labour and Employment (Bangladesh)
5th Jatiya Sangsad members
6th Jatiya Sangsad members
7th Jatiya Sangsad members
8th Jatiya Sangsad members